Alexander, son of Herod was born about 35 BC; died about 7 BC. His mother was the Hasmonean princess Mariamne. 

The unfortunate fate which persistently pursued the Hasmonean house overtook this prince also. As heir presumptive to the throne by right of descent on his mother's side, he was sent to Rome for his education in the year 23 BC. He remained there in the household of Asinius Pollio until about the year 17 BC, when Herod himself brought him and his younger brother Aristobulus, who had been with him, home to Jerusalem. Shortly afterward Alexander received in marriage the Cappadocian Princess Glaphyra, the daughter of King Archelaus of Cappadocia. Glaphyra bore Alexander three children, two sons: Tigranes, Alexander and an unnamed daughter.

Demise
Alexander's handsome presence and frank bearing made him a favorite with the people, and they longed for the day when the house of the Maccabees should mount the throne instead of the half-Jew Herod. But, on the other hand, a certain degree of vanity and a spirit of vindictiveness, which marked him no less than his prepossessing qualities, rendered him extremely unpopular with the partisans of Herod, who had much to fear from a future King Alexander. Josephus was writing for a Roman audience, after a major rebellion and this may not genuine criticism. Salome repeatedly warned Herod of danger threatening him from Alexander and his brother Aristobulus. The king felt that it was not impossible that his sons meditated revenge for Mariamne's execution; and on the other hand, the open antipathy expressed by them against their father combined to open the king's ear to the calumnies of Salome and her fellow-plotters. Herod's attempt to humiliate Alexander by restoring to honor Antipater, an older son by another wife, resulted disastrously.  Antipater's insidious plotting and the open enmity to Herod shown by Alexander widened the breach between father and son to such an extent that in the year 12 BC, Herod felt himself constrained to bring charges against his sons before Augustus. A reconciliation was brought about, but it was of short duration; and shortly afterward (about 10 BC) Alexander was thrown into prison upon the evidence of a tortured witness who accused him of planning the murder of Herod. Intercepted letters were produced which revealed Alexander's bitterness against his father. In vain did Archelaus, Alexander's father-in-law, endeavor to bring about better relations between them; the reconciliation was again a brief one, so that once more the intrigues of Antipater and Salome succeeded in securing the incarceration of Alexander and Aristobulus (about 8 BC). This was dynastic conflict, in the key territory bridging West and East and the context was instability erupting across the Roman Empire.

Conviction
Herod lodged formal complaint of high treason against them with Augustus, who put the matter into Herod's own hands, with the advice to appoint a court of inquiry to consist of Roman officials and his own friends. Such a court of hirelings and favorites was naturally unanimous for conviction. The attempts of Alexander's friends, by means of petition to King Herod, to avert the execution of the sentence, resulted in the death of Tero — an old and devoted servant of Herod who openly remonstrated with the king for the enormity of the proposed judicial crime — and of 300 others who were denounced as partisans of Alexander. The sentence was carried out without delay; about the year 7 BC, at Sebaste (Samaria) — where thirty years before Mariamne's wedding had been celebrated — her sons suffered death by the cord.

References
Josephus, Ant. xv. 10, § 1; xvi. 1, § 2; 3, §§ 1-3; 4, §§ 1-6, etc.; 
Schürer, Gesch. i. (see index); 
Grätz, Gesch. d. Juden, ii. (see index)

Herodian dynasty
Herod the Great
30s BC births
0s BC deaths
1st-century BCE Jews
People executed for treason
People executed by strangulation
Heirs apparent who never acceded